An online shopping directory is a "Yellow Pages-Style" web directory that specializes in ecommerce sites (which are websites that sell products or services).  Inspired by the organizational structure used in traditional shopping mall directories, online shopping directories organize ecommerce sites by their category and subcategory of goods sold. Without the constraints related to shopping at a physical mall (e.g. distance, location, hours of operation, access to transportation), an online shopping directory serves to aggregate all ecommerce sites in one centralized location in order to help a user decide where to shop online.

Variations
A shopping directory is different from a comparison shopping website (which is also referred to as a comparison shopping engine or a price comparison shopping site). While comparison shopping websites present product listings, by category, so a user can compare pricing on same and/or similar products, a shopping directory does not provide product comparison, review or sale. Examples of comparison shopping websites include: Google Shopping, Shopping.com, Shopzilla, TheFind.com

A shopping directory is different from an online marketplace. Marketplaces sell products and/or services that are aggregated from various ecommerce sellers but sold under the branding and infrastructure of the named marketplace itself. Examples of online marketplaces include: Amazon, Etsy and eBay.

A specialized form of a shopping directory is a coupon, daily deal and/or promotional savings site. Coupon sites provide a niche web directory centered on deal aggregation by listing only ecommerce sites that offer additional savings to the user.  Coupon sites are very popular with users but often are viewed negatively by merchants. Examples of coupon sites include: Retailmenot, Coupons.com, Groupon

History
Free directories such as the Open Directory Project, often updated by volunteers, lost their prominence and relevancy in today's search-driven internet.  Before the increased popularity of the Google search engine, shopping directories, such as that found at the Yahoo! Directory or the PayPal Shopping Directory, played a prominent role in users' online shopping habits and behavior. As Google gained dominance, users adapted their shopping search behavior to the new system. Most search engines took over the role traditionally filled by shopping directories.

Recently, criticisms have emerged over the limits of using search engines such as Google and Bing for use in the ecommerce cycle. The dominance of the SEO structure in search makes competition fierce among merchants as they struggle for positioning on the Google search results pages.

New methodologies for shopping directories are emerging as startups look to bridge the gap between ecommerce and search. As ecommerce continues to grow, startup companies are reinvisioning the shopping directory to make it more relevant to the growing needs of online shoppers.

Business model
 Charging a one-time and/or recurring listing fee to the ecommerce site
 Use of affiliate programs of the listed ecommerce sites to earn commissions on referrals
 Advertising in the directory itself, such as banner ads, contextual ads like Google AdSense or some form of sponsored listings (usually pay per click based)
 Combination of above

References

Web directories
E-commerce